The 1929–30 Campionat de Catalunya season was the 31st since its establishment and was played between 22 September and 24 November 1929.

Overview before the season
Six teams joined the Division One league, including three that would play the 1929–30 La Liga and three from the 1929–30 Tercera División.

From La Liga
Barcelona
Espanyol
Europa

From Tercera División
Badalona
Júpiter
Sants

Division One

League table

Results

Top goalscorers

Play-off league

Division Two

Group A

Group B

Relegation league

Copa Catalunya seasons
1929–30 in Spanish football